Maigret's First Case (French: La Première enquête de Maigret, 1913) is a 1948 detective novel by the Belgian writer Georges Simenon, featuring his character Jules Maigret. The book covers Maigret's involvement on his first case in 1913, shortly before the First World War began. It was translated into English, by Robert Brain, in 1958.

References

1948 Belgian novels
Maigret novels
Fiction set in 1913
Novels set in the 1910s
Historical crime novels
Presses de la Cité books